Dolen Peak is the rocky peak rising to 819 m at the northwest coast of Larsen Inlet, Nordenskjöld Coast in Graham Land, Antarctica, situated west of the lower course of Albone Glacier.

The peak is named after the settlement of Dolen in Southwestern Bulgaria.

Location

Map
 Antarctic Digital Database (ADD). Scale 1:250000 topographic map of Antarctica. Scientific Committee on Antarctic Research (SCAR). Since 1993, regularly upgraded and updated.

Notes

References
 Dolen Peak. SCAR Composite Antarctic Gazetteer.
 Bulgarian Antarctic Gazetteer. Antarctic Place-names Commission. (details in Bulgarian, basic data in English)

External links
 Dolen Peak. Copernix satellite image

Mountains of Graham Land
Bulgaria and the Antarctic
Nordenskjöld Coast